Mullah Badar was a governor of the Afghan province of Badghis during the reign of the Taliban.

He was captured by Tajik forces in April 2003.

References

Governors of Badghis Province
Possibly living people
Year of birth missing
Place of birth missing